Merveille (French "marvel, wonder") may refer to:

People
Merveille Lukeba (born 1990), British actor
Merveille Bokadi (born 1992), Congolese professional footballer
Merveille Goblet (born 1994), Belgian footballer
Bobbie Merveille or DJ Heavygrinder, American DJ

Other uses
Merveilles (album), 1998 album by the Japanese rock band Malice Mizer
Merveille (beignet)
Merveille, type of Barbaroux wine
The "Merveille", part of Mont Saint Michel Abbey

See also